The National Fed Challenge is an academic competition that provides high school students (grades 9-12) with an insider's view of how the United States central bank, the Federal Reserve, makes monetary policy.

The Fed Challenge begins with regional and district rounds of competition. Each Fed Challenge team, consisting of three to five students, presents an analysis of the current state of the economy backed by current economic data and a monetary policy recommendation for the Federal Open Market Committee (FOMC). Following the presentation, judges question each team about their presentation and their knowledge of macroeconomic theory. Federal Reserve Bank economists and officers judge the district competitions.

One Fed Challenge team from each of the four participating Federal Reserve Districts competes at the national competition in Washington, D.C. FOMC members — Federal Reserve Governors and Reserve Bank Presidents — judge the national finals.

The competition was created in 1994 by Lloyd Bromberg, the Director of Education Programs at the New York Fed.

Since its peak in 1998 with ten district participants, the Federal Reserve Challenge participation has shrunk to three district participants (as of 2010). In 2009, the National Finals consisted of Choate Rosemary Hall (Boston District), Brebuef Jesuit Preparatory Academy (Chicago District), Montclair High School (New York District), and Collegiate School (Richmond District).

Previous Fed Challenge National Champions 

2010, St. Joseph's High School, South Bend, Indiana
2009, Choate Rosemary Hall, Wallingford, Connecticut
2008, Little Rock Central High School, Little Rock, Arkansas
2007, Little Rock Central High School, Little Rock, Arkansas
2006, Severn School, Maryland
2005, Pittsford Mendon High School, New York
2004, Rumson-Fair Haven Regional High School, New Jersey 
2003, Severn School, Maryland
2002, Maggie L. Walker Governor's School for Government and International Studies, Virginia 
2001, Montclair High School, New Jersey
2000, Midland High School, Texas
1999, University School of Milwaukee, Wisconsin
1998, Bryan High School, Texas
1997, Bryan High School, Texas
1996, Bryan High School, Texas

See also
College National Fed Challenge

References

External links 
1st District (Boston) Fed Challenge
2nd District (New York) Fed Challenge
4th District (Cleveland) Fed Challenge
5th District (Richmond) Fed Challenge
7th District (Chicago) Fed Challenge
10th District (Kansas City) Fed Challenge

Federal Reserve System